The Sea (German: Das Meer) is a 1927 German silent drama film directed by Peter Paul Felner and starring Heinrich George, Olga Tschechowa, and Simone Vaudry.

The film's art direction was by Robert Neppach.

Cast
 Heinrich George as Yann  
 Olga Tschechowa as Rosseherre  
 Simone Vaudry as Yvonne  
 Anton Pointner as Fremder  
 Arthur Strasser 
 Charles Barrois as Kedril

References

Bibliography
 Hans-Michael Bock and Tim Bergfelder. The Concise Cinegraph: An Encyclopedia of German Cinema. Berghahn Books.

External links

1927 films
Films of the Weimar Republic
German silent feature films
Films directed by Peter Paul Felner
Films based on works by Bernhard Kellermann
1927 drama films
German drama films
German black-and-white films
Silent drama films
1920s German films
1920s German-language films